Free Cossacks were Ukrainian Cossacks that were organized as volunteer militia units in the spring of 1917 in the Ukrainian People's Republic. The Free Cossacks are seen as precursors of the modern Ukrainian national law enforcement organizations such as the National Guard of Ukraine or the Internal Troops of Ukraine.

The primary purpose of those militia formations was to provide security and civil order for the local population. The consolidation process of various smaller units started sometime in April near the town of Zvenyhorodka, Kiev Governorate during the local assembly of the Free Cossacks which created the Zvenyhorodka Kosh (battalion). The assembly elected Semen Hryzlo the Kosh Otaman, who became the otaman of Kalnyboloto Kurin (company). Under this title, he was delegated to the 2nd All-Ukrainian Military Congress in Kiev in June 1917.

Hryzlo was also one of the organizers of the 1st All-Ukrainian Congress of the Free Cossacks that took place on October 3, 1917 in the former Cossack capital of Chyhyryn. The congress elected the Hetman of All Ukraine, who became General Pavlo Skoropadskyi. Hryzlo was elected as the General Yesaul.

The Free Cossacks units distinguished themselves during the Ukrainian-Soviet War (particularly from December 1917 to April 1918) and were disbanded around May and June 1918. In January-April 1918 the Ukrainian government tried to create the Free Registered Cossack Troops for county security, but after the April coup-d'etat led by Pavlo Skoropadsky all Free Cossacks formations were officially dissolved.

See also
Red Cossacks
Red Army
Ukraine after the Russian Revolution
Ukrainian–Soviet War
Registered Cossacks

Further reading
Kozub, I. An age and a destiny: memoirs. Canadian Institute of Ukrainian Studies, TAKSON Publishing House. Kyiv-Toronto-Edmonton, 1996.

External links 
Free Cossacks at the Encyclopedia of Ukraine
Free Cossacks (ВІЛЬНЕ КОЗАЦТВО). Encyclopedia of History of Ukraine.

History of the Cossacks in Ukraine
Military history of Ukraine
Military units and formations of Ukraine
Military units and formations established in 1917
Counterinsurgency
Law enforcement agencies of Ukraine
Emergency management in Ukraine
Gendarmerie
Ukrainian People's Republic
Ukrainian–Soviet War